Miami Trace High School is a public high school near Washington Court House, Ohio.  It is the only high school in the Miami Trace Local School District.  Their mascot is the Panthers.  The Miami Trace Local School District serves parts of Washington Court House while also serving the residents in almost every other area in Fayette County as well as small areas in Clinton County near Sabina and Madison County.  Miami Trace is a member of the Frontier Athletic Conference (FAC) composed of Chillicothe, Jackson, Hillsboro, Washington Court House, and McClain. Miami Trace holds strong backgrounds in football, and has built a strong reputation in Girls' Basketball and Wrestling in recent past.  Miami Trace has one of the top FFA chapters in Ohio.

A new elementary school for Miami Trace opened in 2008 adjacent to the high school along Ohio 41 NW.  This building replaced the small, reportedly 100-year-old elementary buildings dotted across the county.  

See also Ohio High School Athletic Association and Ohio High School Athletic Conferences

Notable alumni
 Art Schlichter, Professional American football quarterback
 Glenn Cobb, Two time captain of the Ohio State Buckeyes football team (1981–1982).
Margaret Peterson Haddix, Award Winning Author

References

External links
 Miami Trace Local School District

High schools in Fayette County, Ohio
Public high schools in Ohio